Fiji competed at the World Games 2017 in Wroclaw, Poland, from 20 July 2017 to 30 July 2017.

Competitors

Karate
Fiji has qualified at the 2017 World Games:

Men's Kumite -75 kg - 1 quota (Joji Veremalua)

References 

Nations at the 2017 World Games
2017 in Fijian sport
Fiji at multi-sport events